BillyBoy* (born 10 March 1960) is an American artist, socialite and fashion designer who was a muse of Andy Warhol. Born in Vienna, he was adopted by a Russian couple who moved to New York City when he was four.

In 1979 BillyBoy* began to design and manufacture costume jewellery under the label Surreal  in Paris.

A bracelet made by BillyBoy* and owned by Elizabeth Taylor was sold at auction in 2011 for $6,875.

BillyBoy* had a collection of over 11,000 Barbie dolls and 3,000 Ken dolls, and in 1987 authored the book Barbie: Her Life and Times. During 1984–1990 Mattel sponsored two tours called  (New Theatre of Fashion) curated by BillyBoy*.  Like the original 1945 exhibit , the exhibitions consisted of hundreds of dolls—in this case Barbie dolls—wearing miniature outfits made by Yves Saint Laurent and other prominent fashion designers. The exhibition toured France on board a TGV-train entitled .  BillyBoy* designed two Barbie dolls for Mattel working as a designer and consultant, "" in 1984 and "Feelin' Groovy" in 1986. After finishing working with Mattel, BillyBoy* formed the "BillyBoy* Toys" company, and in 1989 BillyBoy* and his partner released the Mdvanii fashion doll.

Warhol's last work Barbie, Portrait of BillyBoy* was a painting of BillyBoy* depicted as a Barbie doll and was presented to BillyBoy* in New York on 10 February 1986. The painting was gifted to BillyBoy* and hung in his living room.  In 2014 the painting sold at the auction house Christie's for £722,500 ($1,161,780).  A second version of Warhol's painting, this time with an orange-red background instead of blue, was created for and purchased by Mattel.

In 1978 or 1979 BillyBoy* moved to Paris, where later his shop would be at 6 Rue de la Paix, Paris.  In 1993 BillyBoy* and his partner Jean Pierre Lestrade ("Lala") moved to Trouville-sur-Mer in France, then in 1997 to Switzerland, and finally in 2011 to Delémont, the capital of the Canton of Jura and near Basel.  On 6 February 2012 BillyBoy* and Jean Pierre Lestrade married at the L’Hôtel de Ville in Délémont.

On 13 February 1998 BillyBoy* and Lestrade founded the  non-profit in Yverdon-les-Bains, Switzerland. In 2012 the website of the Foundation was updated to reflect the creation of a future museum in Delémont.

Works

References

Further reading

 
 
 
 
 
 

1960 births
Living people
American jewelry designers
American fashion designers
American contemporary artists
American pop artists
American gay artists
LGBT fashion designers
21st-century American LGBT people